Close Erase (initiated 1995 in Trondheim, Norway) is a Norwegian jazz group, comprising Per Oddvar Johansen (drums), Ingebrigt Håker Flaten (bass) and Christian Wallumrød (piano).

Biography 
Close Erase play an experimental jazz fusion inspired by musicians like Paul Bley and Svein Finnerud. The first two album releases were Close Erase (1996) and No.2 (1999) on the label NorCD, with Audun Kleive as producer. They turned electric on the third album Dance This (2002) that was nominated for the Spellemannprisen and was acclaimed by the magazines The Wire and Jazzwise before their London debut September 10, 2002, and was "shocked by this highly original trio". The fourth album release was Sport Rocks (2006), with an increasingly hard-swinging and electronic style à la Supersilent.

Discography 
 1996: Close Erase (NorCD)
 1999: No. 2 (NorCD)
 2002: Dance This (Bergland Produsjon)
 2006: Sport Rocks (Jazzaway)

Compilation
 2010: R.I.P. Complete Recordings 1995–2007 (Plastic Strip)

References

External links 
Close Erase at Per Oddvar Johansen's site

Norwegian jazz ensembles
Norwegian experimental musical groups
Musical groups established in 1995
Musical groups from Oslo
NorCD artists
Jazzaway Records artists